The Mendota Light,  also known as the Bete Grise light, was built on the Keweenaw Peninsula of Michigan to facilitate travel between Lake Superior and Lac La Belle (an artificial canal having been made to connect the two).

History
The original plans were laid in 1867 and the lighthouse was constructed in 1869.  Only one year later, the light was decommissioned as it was found by navigators to be of no assistance (nor was there any other commercial reason to make this trip).

The tower was removed and taken to Marquette, but the keeper's house remained in place.  In 1892, ships tried to use this bay for a safe harbor during a storm, and the seafarers, observing the house (at this point deserted), suggested that the harbor would be easier to find if there was a light present.  By 1895, funds had been allocated to re-establish the light, but it was determined that the existing structure had deteriorated so much that it could not be used.  A new structure was built using the original foundations.

In 1933 the light was automated and in 1956 it was decommissioned.

It was a private residence until 1996.  The lighthouse, only accessible by boat since no roads or private drives lead to it, was for sale in 1996. It was sold to a person willing to conserve the light.  The original fourth order Fresnel lens was found, restored and in 1998 relit.  It is still in place and in use. Efforts are being made to maintain the light for the "next 100 years".

The light is now classified as an active private aid to navigation.

To view the light, travel to the Keweenaw Peninsula of Upper Michigan to the town of Bete Grise. The road ends at the Mendota Ship Canal. Take the short walk to the Ship Canal. You will see the station boathouse across the Canal, and the Mendota Light itself a little to the east.

National Register Status: PART OF LISTING; Reference #80004840  Name of Listing: HISTORIC ENGINEERING & INDUSTRIAL SITES IN MICHIGAN TR.

References

External links
Aerial photos, Mendota Light, marinas.com.
lighthousesRus - A map to the Mendota Lighthouse.
Bete Grise Preserve home page
 Detroit News, Interactive map on Michigan lighthouses.
 Interactive map of lighthouses in eastern Lake Superior.
 Lighthouse Central, Mendota (Bete Grise) light The Ultimate Guide to Upper Michigan Lighthouses by Jerry Roach. (Publisher: Bugs Publishing LLC - 2007).  .
 Michigan Lighthouse Conservancy, Bete Grise Light.
 Michigan lighthouse fund, Bete Grise Light.
 Michigan organizations, Bete Grise Light.
 National Park Service Haritime Heritage, Inventory of Historic Lighthouses, Bete Grise Light.
 Terry Pepper, Seeing the Light, Bete Grise Light.
  Bete Grise Light.
 Wobser, David, Bete Grise Light (Mendota) boatnerd.com.

Lighthouses completed in 1869
Houses completed in 1869
Lighthouses completed in 1895
Lighthouses on the National Register of Historic Places in Michigan
Lighthouses in Keweenaw County, Michigan
1869 establishments in Michigan
National Register of Historic Places in Keweenaw County, Michigan